The Mickey Charles Award is awarded annually for academic achievement by a student-athlete in the Division I Football Championship Subdivision (formerly Division I-AA) of college football, and was first awarded in 2014.

The award is named for the CEO and President of The Sports Network, Mickey Charles. Charles is noted for having recognized the need for national coverage of the FCS (formerly Division I-AA college football) before he created the FCS Awards in 1987.

Winners

References

External links
[www.fcsawards.com] - Past winners from The Sports Network

College football national player awards
Awards established in 2014
2014 establishments in the United States